The 1989 Baltimore Orioles season was a season in American baseball. It involved the Orioles finishing 2nd in the American League East with a record of 87 wins and 75 losses.  The team was known as the Comeback Kids as they rebounded from the 54 wins and 107 losses of the 1988 season. The season also took on the "Why Not?!" promotional slogan as the team's pursuit of the pennant went down to the final series of the regular season. The Orioles went into the three-game season finale against the first place Toronto Blue Jays down by one game in the AL East standings and needing either a sweep to win the AL East championship, or two wins to force a one-game playoff.  The Blue Jays won the first two games of the series, clinching first place on the penultimate game of the season.

Offseason
 October 3, 1988: Don Aase was released by the Orioles.
 November 9, 1988: Pete Blohm (minors) was traded by the Orioles to the Pittsburgh Pirates for Randy Milligan.
 November 17, 1988: Dickie Noles was released by the Orioles.
 December 4, 1988: Eddie Murray was traded by the Orioles to the Los Angeles Dodgers for Ken Howell, Brian Holton, and Juan Bell.
 December 8, 1988: Ken Howell and Gordon Dillard were traded by the Orioles to the Philadelphia Phillies for Phil Bradley.
 March 1, 1989: Mark Huismann was signed as a free agent by the Orioles.
 March 31, 1989: Carl Nichols was traded by the Orioles to the Houston Astros for Dave Johnson and Victor Hithe (minors).

Regular season
Bill Ripken's 1989 Fleer Baseball Card (#616) made national news when it included a hidden obscenity (the words "fuck face"). The obscenity was printed in black marker on the knob of his bat. Once the discovery was made public, subsequent printings of the card were issued with the words obscured. The first obscuring involved a blob of white out, another was scribbled with a black pen while the last was covered with a black square.
In the finale of the 1989 season, Ben McDonald tossed one scoreless inning of relief, logging his first career win. Of note, he would become the sixth player to make the majors in the same season that he was selected as the number one overall pick in the Major League Baseball Amateur Draft.

Opening Day starters
 Brady Anderson
 Phil Bradley
 Steve Finley
 Rene Gonzales
 Cal Ripken Jr.
 Dave Schmidt
 Larry Sheets
 Mickey Tettleton
 Jim Traber
 Craig Worthington

Season standings

Record vs. opponents

Notable transactions
 May 19, 1989: Rick Schu was purchased from the Orioles by the Detroit Tigers.
 June 1, 1989: John Posey (minors) was traded by the Orioles to the Philadelphia Phillies for Shane Turner.
 June 5, 1989: 1989 Major League Baseball Draft
Ben McDonald was drafted by the Orioles in the 1st round (1st pick). Player signed August 19, 1989.
Mike Oquist was drafted by the Orioles in the 13th round. Player signed June 14, 1989.
Gregg Zaun was drafted by the Orioles in the 17th round. Player signed August 25, 1989.
 July 20, 1989: John Habyan was traded by the Orioles to the New York Yankees for Stan Jefferson.
 July 28, 1989: Brian Dubois was traded by the Orioles to the Detroit Tigers for Keith Moreland.
 August 5, 1989: Jamie Quirk was signed as a free agent by the Orioles.

Roster

Player stats

Batting

Starters by position
Note: Pos = Position; G = Games played; AB = At bats; H = Hits; Avg. = Batting average; HR = Home runs; RBI = Runs batted in

Other batters
Note: G = Games played; AB = At bats; H = Hits; Avg. = Batting average; HR = Home runs; RBI = Runs batted in

Pitching

Starting pitchers
Note: G = Games pitched; IP = Innings pitched; W = Wins; L = Losses; ERA = Earned run average; SO = Strikeouts

Other pitchers
Note: G = Games pitched; IP = Innings pitched; W = Wins; L = Losses; ERA = Earned run average; SO = Strikeouts

Relief pitchers
Note: G = Games pitched; IP = Innings pitched; W = Wins; L = Losses; SV = Saves; ERA = Earned run average; SO = Strikeouts

Awards and honors
 Frank Robinson, Associated Press Manager of the Year
 Frank Robinson, American League Manager of the Year
 Gregg Olson, American League Rookie of the Year
MLB All-Star Game
 Cal Ripken Jr.

Farm system

References

1989 Baltimore Orioles team page at Baseball Reference
1989 Baltimore Orioles season at baseball-almanac.com

Baltimore Orioles seasons
Baltimore Orioles season
Baltimore Orioles